Poladryas arachne, the arachne checkerspot, is a species of crescents, checkerspots, anglewings, etc. in the butterfly family Nymphalidae.

The MONA or Hodges number for Poladryas arachne is 4514.

Subspecies
These five subspecies belong to the species Poladryas arachne:
 Poladryas arachne arachne (W. H. Edwards, 1869)
 Poladryas arachne expedita Austin in T. Emmel, 1998
 Poladryas arachne gilensis (W. Holland, 1930)
 Poladryas arachne monache (J. A. Comstock, 1918)
 Poladryas arachne nympha (W. H. Edwards, 1884)

References

Further reading

 

Melitaeini
Articles created by Qbugbot